Carl C. James (September 18, 1925 – November 14, 2005) was an American collegiate sports executive. He was the commissioner of the Big Eight Conference from 1980 through 1996.

Biography

Early life and education
A native of Raleigh, N.C., he graduated from Duke University.

Awards and honors
1996: James J. Corbett Memorial Award

References

External links
 Duke profile

1925 births
2005 deaths
Big Eight Conference commissioners
Duke Blue Devils athletic directors
Duke Blue Devils football players
Maryland Terrapins athletic directors
College men's track and field athletes in the United States
Sportspeople from Raleigh, North Carolina